There has been many regnal styles of Serbian sovereigns.

Middle Ages

Modern
"Prince of Serbia" (see Principality of Serbia), in use 1817–82
"King of Serbia" (see Kingdom of Serbia), in use 1882–1918
"King of Serbs, Croats and Slovenes" (see Kingdom of Serbs, Croats and Slovenes), in use 1918–29
"King of Yugoslavia" (see Kingdom of Yugoslavia), in use 1929–45

See also
Serbian royal titles

Annotations

References

Further reading

Serbia
Serbian monarchy